Hypostomus lexi is a species of catfish in the family Loricariidae. It is native to South America, where it occurs in the Grande River basin in Brazil. The species is large for a loricariid, reaching 46 cm (18.1 inches) SL, and it is believed to be a facultative air-breather.

References 

lexi
Fish of Brazil
Catfish of South America
Endemic fauna of Brazil
Fish described in 1911